Rodney Marinelli (born July 13, 1949) is an American football coach. He has been a defensive coach for several college and professional teams, serving primarily as a defensive line coach when he has not been a coordinator. From 2006 until 2008, Marinelli was the head coach of the NFL's Detroit Lions, where he presided over their infamous winless 2008 season.

Coaching career

Early career
Marinelli's coaching career began in 1973 as an assistant at Rosemead High School in suburban Los Angeles from 1973 to 1975. He earned his first collegiate job in 1976, serving as an assistant to Bruce Snyder at Utah State University until 1982. He then moved on to the University of California for nine seasons, serving as the defensive line coach and later the assistant head coach.  He was then on staff with Arizona State University for three seasons, again holding a dual role as defensive line and assistant head coach, between 1992 and 1994. Marinelli spent his final year in college football at the University of Southern California in 1995.

National Football League

Tampa Bay Buccaneers
Marinelli went to the Tampa Bay Buccaneers in 1996 and was the defensive line coach for six seasons under head coach Tony Dungy. In the latter four seasons he also served as assistant head coach, winning a Super Bowl in 2003.  He was known for his structured approach and his commitment for trying to get the most out of his players. There he worked to develop linemen such as Warren Sapp and Simeon Rice into Hall of Fame caliber players. During Marinelli's tenure in Tampa Bay, the Buccaneers earned more sacks than any other franchise.

Detroit Lions
On January 18, 2006, Marinelli was named the head coach of the Detroit Lions, replacing Dick Jauron. Marinelli was the third coach hired by Lions CEO Matt Millen, preceded by Marty Mornhinweg and Steve Mariucci.

The Marinelli era began poorly, as the Lions lost the first five games of the 2006 season before beating the Buffalo Bills 20–17. The Lions lost seven games in a row between weeks 10 and 16 before ending the year on a high note by beating the Dallas Cowboys 39–31.

The 2007 season started off well for the Lions as they started 6–2. However, the Lions lost seven out of their last eight games, and finished the 2007 season 3rd in the NFC North with a 7–9 record.

Despite a perfect 4–0 preseason, Marinelli coached the 2008 Lions to a winless 0–16 campaign, the first winless season for any NFL team since the 16-game regular season was instituted in 1978. (The last team to lose all of their games was the 1976 Tampa Bay Buccaneers, who went 0–14; the last team to not win a game was the 1982 Baltimore Colts, who were 0–8–1 in a strike-shortened campaign. The Cleveland Browns later repeated a winless 0-16 campaign in 2017.)

On December 29, 2008, Marinelli was fired, in addition to the majority of his coaching staff. His record during the three seasons with the Lions was 10–38, one of the worst in NFL history for a head coach with at least three years' experience. Among coaches with at least 10 career wins, only Bert Bell has a worse record (10–46–2); Steve Spagnuolo posted the same 10–38 mark as Marinelli.

Chicago Bears
Marinelli joined the Chicago Bears in January 2009 as assistant head coach and defensive line coach, reuniting him with Lovie Smith, whom he worked with under Tony Dungy in Tampa Bay from 1996–2000. Marinelli also interviewed with the Houston Texans and Seattle Seahawks before joining the Bears. Marinelli was promoted from defensive line coach to defensive coordinator in February 2010. In the 2010 to 2012 seasons, Marinelli's defenses ranked ninth, seventeenth, and fifth, respectively. Also in 2012, the Bears led the NFL in interceptions with 24, along with in takeaways with 44, sixth in third-down efficiency (35.5 percent) and eighth in sacks with 41, while ranking third with the fewest points allowed (477). Marinelli left the Bears in January 2013.

Dallas Cowboys
On January 18, 2013, Marinelli joined the Dallas Cowboys as defensive line coach. Marinelli was promoted to defensive coordinator after the demotion of Monte Kiffin on January 28, 2014.

The Cowboys posted a 12–4 record in Marinelli's first season as the defensive coordinator, his defense ranked 14th after being expected, by many before the season, to be the worst in the history of the NFL. 
 
On January 13, 2015, Marinelli signed a 3-year extension with the Cowboys to remain the defensive coordinator.

Las Vegas Raiders
On February 5, 2020, Marinelli was named the defensive line coach for the Raiders. On December 13, 2020, Marinelli was promoted to interim defensive coordinator, following the firing of Paul Guenther.

On February 11, 2022, Marinelli announced that he would be retiring from coaching.

Head coaching record

Personal life

Marinelli and his wife, Barbara, have two daughters, Chris and Gina. Chris is married to Joe Barry, the Green Bay Packers defensive coordinator.

Marinelli is a veteran of the Vietnam War. He was wounded in Vietnam and contracted malaria.

References

External links
 Las Vegas Raiders bio

1949 births
Living people
American people of Italian descent
Arizona State Sun Devils football coaches
California Golden Bears football coaches
Cal Lutheran Kingsmen football players
Chicago Bears coaches
Dallas Cowboys coaches
Detroit Lions head coaches
High school football coaches in California
Las Vegas Raiders coaches
National Football League defensive coordinators
Sportspeople from Los Angeles County, California
Tampa Bay Buccaneers coaches
USC Trojans football coaches
Utah State Aggies football coaches